The  was a school established in 1927 by the French Protectorate in Azrou, Morocco.

History 
After 1920, French , who were rigorously prepared in an Amazigh dialect and trained as teachers and intelligence gatherers, were assigned to schools in rural areas for speakers of Amazigh languages. It trained its Amazigh students for high roles in the colonial administration, as well as forming "a Berber elite steeped in French culture, in an environment where Arabic influences were rigorously excluded." This hierarchical educational system was designed to "guarantee an indigenous elite loyal to France and ready to enter its service," though its permeability in practice made it a "vehicle of social mobility."

References 

Education in Morocco